This is a list of the 33 members of the European Parliament for Romania in the 2009 to 2014 session.

List

Notes

External links
BEC results

2009
List
Romania